The Man in the Velvet Mask is an original novel written by Daniel O'Mahony and based on the long-running British science fiction television series Doctor Who. The novel features the First Doctor and Dodo.

The story is set in an alternate universe version of the French Revolution and features the Marquis de Sade as a prominent character.

Plot
The TARDIS lands in post-revolutionary France, but something is off: a futuristic structure called the New Bastille towers over a twisted version of Paris, ruled over by the tyrannical First Deputy Minski, adopted son of the infamous Marquis de Sade. An ailing Doctor is arrested as a curfew breaker, Dodo is recruited by a group of wandering players with less than decent intentions, and in the dungeons of the Bastille, one called Prisoner 6 cannot remember who he is. Outside space and time, aliens watch as their experiment begins to go wrong.

Sequel
The author intended to write a direct sequel to this novel, a black comedy named Viet Cong! and set in 1916, but it was not commissioned.

References

1996 British novels
1996 science fiction novels
Virgin Missing Adventures
First Doctor novels
Novels by Daniel O'Mahony
Alternate history novels
Novels set in the French Revolution
Fiction set in 1804